Socialist Party of Catalonia–Regrouping (PSC–R) was a political party in Catalonia, Spain. The PSC–R was founded in 1976 as a continuation of the Socialist and Democratic Regrouping of Catalonia.

History
Its first secretary was Josep Pallach i Carolà. In the General Elections of 1977 PSC–R stood on joint lists with Democratic Convergence of Catalonia (CDC), Democratic Left of Catalonia and the National Front of Catalonia as the Democratic Pact for Catalonia. The lists obtained the 16.68%% of the votes and 11 seats, 4 of them to the PSC-R.

In 1978 PSC–R merged with the Catalan Federation of the PSOE and the Socialist Party of Catalonia–Congress, forming the Socialists' Party of Catalonia (PSC).

See also
Socialists' Party of Catalonia
Unified Socialist Party of Catalonia
List of political parties in Catalonia

References

 Glòria Rubiol (1995). Josep Pallach i el reagrupament. L'Abadia de Montserrat. .

Defunct political parties in Catalonia
Defunct socialist parties in Catalonia